Olearia iodochroa, commonly known as the violet daisy bush, is a species of flowering plant in the family Asteraceae and is endemic to south-eastern continental Australia. It is a shrub with branchlets densely covered with whitish hairs, narrowly egg-shaped leaves with the narrower end towards the base, and white or mauve, and cream-coloured, yellow or blue, daisy-like inflorescences.

Description
The lower surface of the leaves is densely covered with hairs similar to those on the branchlets, and the upper surface is glabrous.

Taxonomy
Violet daisy bush was first formally described in 1860 by Ferdinand von Mueller who gave it the name Eurybia iodochroa in his Fragmenta Phytographiae Australiae from specimens collected near the Genoa River. In 1867, George Bentham changed the name to Olearia iodochroa in Flora Australiensis. The specific epithet (iodochroa) means "violet coloured".

Distribution and habitat
Olearia iodochroa grows on rocky outcrops in woodland and forest in elevated places from Bimberi Peak and Captains Flat in south-eastern New South Wales to the far east of Victoria.

Use in horticulture
This daisy bush can be grown from seed or from cuttings and is hardy in most soils if grown in full sun or part shade. It can be grown as a hedge if planted side-by-side, and kept pruned.

References

iodochroa
Flora of New South Wales
Flora of Victoria (Australia)
Taxa named by Ferdinand von Mueller
Plants described in 1860